The World Wrestling Council (WWC) (Spanish: "Consejo Mundial de Lucha"), is a Puerto Rican professional wrestling promotion based in Puerto Rico. It was originally established as Capitol Sports Promotions in 1973 by Carlos Colón Sr., Victor Jovica, and Gorilla Monsoon. It was a member of the National Wrestling Alliance until 1988. By the mid-1990s, the promotion had changed its name to the World Wrestling Council.

History

Beginnings (1970s)

Capitol Sports Promotions, with Carlos Colón, Victor Jovica and Gorilla Monsoon as promoters/co-owners of the organization, was a member of the National Wrestling Alliance (NWA) until late 1988, when Gorilla Monsoon left. The company then went bankrupt (as confirmed by Víctor Quiñones in an interview with prwrestling.com). Thomas Collado was the owner in 1976, before Carlos Colón and Victor Jovica.

Capitol Sports Promotions gained fame in Puerto Rican homes soon after their TV show, Super Estrellas de la Lucha Libre, went on-air every weekend on channel 4, WAPA-TV. The taped show is still aired on weekends (both Saturday and Sunday for two hours until March 2008 when it was reduced to one hour on both Saturdays and Sundays due to declining ratings). From 1973 to 1980 it aired on channel 11 (Telecadena Pérez Perry, then on Teleonce after the before mentioned went off the air), on channel 7 on Sunday evenings at 6pm and on Telemundo on Saturday mornings at 10am.

Pinnacle (1980s)
Capitol Sports Promotions began touring all over the island, and with the golden era of boxing in Puerto Rico limited only to Ponce and the metropolitan area of Puerto Rico, Capitol Sports Promotions took their shows to many, inner country towns where people were not used to seeing live in-ring sports events. As a result, Capitol's shows usually filled the smaller town arenas.

During one specific stretch, CSP sold out a 30,000 venue at Bayamón during 13 consecutive shows. High profile wrestlers were winning in the range of $3,000–5,000 per weekend.

In 1983, Rickin Sánchez had taken over as Capitol's main promoter, as well as becoming one of the organization's broadcasters on the television shows. He was joined by the already retired Savinovich. Some time later, Sánchez (and his production company R & F Television) left the production of Superestrellas de la Lucha Libre due to some disagreements with the ownership of WWC. After these events, Savinovich became the main host of the programs.

The World Wrestling Council was a member National Wrestling Alliance from 1979 until 1987.

As the market remained a lucrative and “hot territory” within the organization, the presence of the NWA World Heavyweight Championship became ubiquitous in large events, predominantly represented by perennial headliner Ric Flair. On January 6, 1983, Colón defeated the latter to complete an unofficial run with the belt, retaining momentum afterwards and being ranked in Pro Wrestling Illustrated's “Top 10” throughout 1984.

Death of Bruiser Brody (1988)
On July 16, 1988, American star Bruiser Brody was stabbed at the locker room of the Juan Ramon Loubriel Stadium in Bayamón, prior to a show. Brody died from the stab wounds later on that night. The man who stabbed him was fellow wrestler and booker José Huertas-González, known as Invader I. Apparently, the two men had a real-life feud that led to a confrontation in the locker room, that concluded with Brody receiving stab wounds to his chest and stomach. The only one to witness the series of events that ended in the death was WWC wrestler Tony Atlas. Atlas said he saw both men enter the shower area of the locker room (nobody actually heard the argument nor saw the actual fight and stabbing). As Tony looked over to Carlos Colón, he then heard sounds and (Atlas claimed) he saw Brody hunched over with González brandishing a bloody knife about to finish Brody off. Tony and Carlos rushed to break it up along with several angry wrestlers.

After Brody's death, and the negative publicity that followed, WWC went through some difficult years. Mr. Jose Huertas-Gonzalez was acquitted by a jury after he testified in his own defense, and claimed self-defense. The witnesses who were supposed to testify about the murder did not show up claiming that they did not get their summons until after the trial was over.

Rebrand (1990s)
By the mid 1990s, the organization changed its official name to World Wrestling Council. Women also began to have an ever-increasing presence in the organization during that decade.

WWC vs. IWA-PR (2000–2006)
With the turn of the century came some changes that troubled the franchise. A promotion called International Wrestling Association (IWA-PR), promoted by Víctor Quiñones, became WWC's biggest competitor when it made an alliance with wrestling giant the World Wrestling Federation (WWF) which in turn brought American superstars to IWA-PR.

Fallout of hurricane Maria (2017–2019)
Following the passing of Hurricane Maria over Puerto Rico, the WWC headquarters lost power for a prolonged time period due to infrastructure damage. In response, the promotion issued licenses to some of its wrestlers to participate in the local independent scene, barring some creative limitations that prevented them from being booked in clean defeats. As of December 2017, WWC's one-hour weekend shows on WAPA-TV continued to rerun the last several episodes produced prior to Maria. Almost five months after the hurricane, WWC confirmed its return with new episodes of the weekend shows (consisting of newly-recorded commentary and interview segments mixed with repeats of high-profile matches) leading up to a new live event on March 3, 2018.

On July 23, 2018, longtime talent Ramón Álvarez (a.k.a. El Bronco No. 1) and Engel Landolfi unveiled a spinoff based in the Dominican Republic, WWC DR, receiving the support of Colón and Jovica (who loaned both the trade name and logo for use). Its first event was scheduled for October 28, 2018, featuring talent from both WWC (such as Carlito, Gilbert, Thunder and Lightning) and local competitor WWL (Superstar Ash, Ángel Fashion and Vanilla Vargas).

In November 2018, WWE acquired the WWC video library.

Administrative changes (2019)
While still part of WWE's roster (yet inactive), Eddie and Orlando Colón returned to WWC, working in both administrative roles and as in-ring talent in 2019. Ray González was brought back in and placed in a creative role that was described onscreen as Director of Operations.

Collaboration with IWA-PR (2020–2021)
On February 13, 2020, a video where Ray González extended an invitation to Savio Vega (now acting as president of the IWA-PR after it emerged from a hiatus in 2018) to attend a WWC to present him with a proposal that would be mutually beneficial was posted in the IWA-PR's social media platforms. After some anticipation, the summon was accepted in a subsequent segment aired in Superestrellas de la Lucha Libre. On February 15, 2020, Vega accepted a copy of the document from González and informed that he would give his final answer at the IWA-PR event Histeria Boricua 2020. During this skit, the heel faction known as Legacy (composed by Eddie Colón, Gilbert and Peter John Ramos) were placed in antagonism to the agreement. The collaboration concluded in June 2021 when, according to Vega, WWC stopped answering his calls.

LAWE and restart (2021–present)
In March 2021 a promotion named Latin American Wrestling Entertainment (LAWE) was inscribed in the Puerto Rico Department of State with Eddie Colón as its president. In June Mike Chioda publicly revealed his involvement in the project. It officially launched in July, with Stacy Colón as its onscreen CEO. LAWE began announcing the signing of several wrestlers, among who was the incumbent Universal Heavyweight Champion Gilbert. The Colón cousins were also part of these roster additions. WWC avoided updating its status, but their Youtube channel was emptied and its official Facebook page was repurposed by former narrator Antonio “Tony” Montesinos. LAWE had a separate structure, including social media presence.

On August 25, 2021, it was reported that the Colóns intended a merger by purchasing the shares owned by Victor Jovica. When negotiations failed to reach and agreement, all but Orlando and José Colón left LAWE. On August 30, 2021, WWC announced that it would resume the organization of events led by Carlos Colón, González and Jovica.

Roster

Others

Referees

Recurrent events

Championships

Current

Defunct and inactive

See also

Professional wrestling in Puerto Rico
List of professional wrestling promotions

References

Bibliography

External links

 
1973 establishments in Puerto Rico
1973 in professional wrestling
Organizations established in 1973
National Wrestling Alliance members
Puerto Rican professional wrestling promotions